Arto Väinö Uolevi Pirttilahti (born 4 April 1963 in Pohjaslahti) is a Finnish politician in the Parliament of Finland since 2011 for the Centre Party at the Pirkanmaa constituency.

References

1963 births
Living people
People from Pirkanmaa
Centre Party (Finland) politicians
Members of the Parliament of Finland (2011–15)
Members of the Parliament of Finland (2015–19)
Members of the Parliament of Finland (2019–23)